Billy Bang (September 20, 1947 – April 11, 2011), born William Vincent Walker, was an American free jazz violinist and composer.

Biography

Bang's family moved to New York City's Bronx neighborhood while he was still an infant, and as a child he attended a special school for musicians in nearby Harlem. At that school, students were assigned instruments based on their physical size. Bang was fairly small, so he received a violin instead of either of his first choices, the saxophone or the drums. It was around this time that he acquired the nickname of "Billy Bang", derived from a popular cartoon character.

Bang studied the violin until he earned a hardship scholarship to the Stockbridge School in Stockbridge, Massachusetts, at which point he abandoned the instrument because the school did not have a music program. He had difficulty adjusting to life at the school, where he encountered racism and developed confusion about his identity, which he later blamed for his onset of schizophrenia. Bang felt that he had little in common with the largely privileged children at the school, who included Jackie Robinson, Jr. (son of baseball star Jackie Robinson) and Arlo Guthrie, and he struggled to reconcile the disparity between the wealth of the school and the poverty of his home in New York. He left the school after two years and attended a school in the Bronx. He did not graduate, decided not to return to school after receiving his draft papers, and at the age of 18, he was drafted into the United States Army.

Bang spent six months in basic training and another two weeks learning jungle warfare, arriving in South Vietnam just before the Tet Offensive. Starting out as an infantryman, he did one tour of combat duty, rising to the rank of sergeant before he mustered out.

After Bang returned from the war, his life lacked direction. The job he had held before the army had been filled in his absence. He pursued and then abandoned a law degree, before becoming politically active and falling in with an underground group of revolutionaries. The group recognized Bang's knowledge of weapons from his time in the Army, and they used him to procure firearms for the group during trips to Maryland and Virginia, buying from pawnshops and other small operators who did not conduct extensive background checks. During one of these trips, Bang spotted three violins hanging at the back of a pawnshop, and he impulsively purchased one.

He later joined Sun Ra's band. In 1977, Bang co-founded the String Trio of New York (with guitarist James Emery and double bassist John Lindberg). Billy Bang explored his experience in Vietnam in two albums:  Vietnam:  The Aftermath (2001) and Vietnam:  Reflections (2005), recorded with a band which included several other veterans of that war. The latter album also features two Vietnamese musicians based in the United States (voice and đàn tranh zither).

Bang died on April 11, 2011. According to an associate, Bang had had lung cancer. He had been scheduled to perform on the opening day of the Xerox Rochester International Jazz Festival on June 10, 2011. He is buried at Woodlawn Cemetery, Bronx, New York.

Discography

As leader
 1977: Black Man's Blues (& Survival Ensemble) (Unissued NoBusiness 2011)
 1978: New York Collage (& Survival Ensemble) (Anima Recs reissued as NoBusiness 2011)
 1979: Distinction Without a Difference (hat Hut)
 1979: Sweet Space (Anima)
 1981: Rainbow Gladiator (Soul Note)
 1981: Changing Seasons (Bellows)
 1982: Invitation (Soul Note)
 1982: Bangception, Willisau 1982 (hatOLOGY)
 1982: Live at Green Space (Anima)
 1983: Outline No. 12 (Celluloid)
 1983: Bangception (Hat Hut)
 1984: The Fire from Within (Soul Note)
 1986: Live at Carlos 1 (Soul Note)
 1991: Valve No. 10 (Soul Note)
 1992: A Tribute to Stuff Smith (Soul Note)
 1996: Spirits Gathering (CIMP)
 1997: Bang On! (Justin Time)
 1997: Commandment (No More)
 1999: Big Bang Theory (Justin Time)
 2001: Vietnam: The Aftermath (Justin Time)
 2003: Hip Hop Bebop (ITM)
 2004: Vietnam: Reflections (Justin Time)
 2005: Configuration (Silkheart) with Sirone
 2007: Above and Beyond: An Evening in Grand Rapids (Justin Time)
 2008: Live at the Sunset, FAB trio (Fonda/Altschul/Bang) (Marge)
 2009: Four Seasons - East meets West (Heart Lord Studio, Japan)
 2010: Prayer for Peace (TUM)
 2013: Da Bang! (TUM)

With the String Trio of New York
 First String (Black Saint, 1979)
 Area Code 212 (Black Saint, 1980)
 Common Goal (Black Saint, 1983)
 Rebirth of a Feeling (Black Saint, 1983)
 Natural Balance (Black Saint, 1986)

As sideman
With Ahmed Abdullah
 Tara's Song (TUM, 2005)
 Traveling the Spaceways (Planet Arts, 2004)

With Marilyn Crispell
 Spirit Music (Cadence, 1983)

With Kahil El'Zabar
 Big Cliff (Delmark, 1995)
 The Power (CIMP, 2000)
 Spirits Entering (Delmark, 2001)
 If You Believe... (8th Harmonic Breakdown, 2002)
 Live at the River East Art Center (Delmark, 2005)
 Big M: A Tribute to Malachi Favors (Delmark, 2006)

With The Group (Ahmed Abdullah, Marion Brown, Bang, Sirone, Fred Hopkins, Andrew Cyrille)
 Live (recorded in 1986, issued in 2012 by NoBusiness Records)

With William Hooker
 Joy (Within)! (1995)

With John Lindberg
 Dimension 5 (Black Saint, 1981)

With William Parker
 Through Acceptance of the Mystery Peace (Centering, 1980)
 Scrapbook (Thirsty Ear, 2003)
 Wood Flute Songs (AUM Fidelity, 2013)

With World Saxophone Quartet
 Experience (2004)

References

External links

 
 Billy Bang at Myspace
 Billy Bang discography at MindSpring
 Billy Bang interview by Fred Jung at All About Jazz
 Billy Bang audio interview at New England Jazz History Database
 Billy Bang obituary by Steve Smith in The New York Times
 Billy Bang bio from Justin Time Records

1947 births
2011 deaths
American jazz violinists
American male violinists
United States Army personnel of the Vietnam War
Avant-garde jazz composers
Avant-garde jazz violinists
CIMP artists
Free jazz composers
Free jazz violinists
Musicians from Mobile, Alabama
20th-century American violinists
Burials at Woodlawn Cemetery (Bronx, New York)
Electric violinists
Jazz musicians from Alabama
Male jazz composers
20th-century American male musicians
String Trio of New York members
Justin Time Records artists
Deaths from lung cancer in New York (state)
United States Army non-commissioned officers
NoBusiness Records artists